Maharajapuram Santhanam, (20 May 1928-24 June 1992) was an Indian Carnatic music vocalist. He was awarded the Madras Music Academy's Sangeetha Kalanidhi in 1989. He was born in Sirunangur, a village in the state of Tamil Nadu. He followed the footsteps of his father Maharajapuram Viswanatha Iyer who was also a renowned Carnatic vocalist.

Career 
Besides studying with his father, he was also a disciple of Melattur Sama Dikshitar. Maharajapuram Santhanam was also a distinguished composer. He wrote many songs on Lord Murugan and Kanchi Shankaracharya, Sri Chandrasekarendra Saraswati Swamigal (Maha Periyavar). He was the principal of Ramanathan College in Sri Lanka. Later he came and settled in Chennai. The songs which were popularised by Maharajapuram Santhanam are,"Bho Shambo" (Revati), "Madhura Madhura" (Bagheshri), both composed by Swami Dayananda Saraswati, "Unnai Allal" (Kalyani Raga), "Sadha Nin Padhame gathi, Varam onnru" (Shanmukhapriya), "Srichakra Raja" (Ragamalika), "Nalinakaanthimathim" (Ragamalika),"Ksheerabdi kannike" (Ragamalika), "Thillana (Revathy)" among others. The Maharajapuram Santhanam Day is celebrated on 3 December every year.

He died in a car accident near Chennai on 24 June 1992, which also killed a few other members of his family. His sons Maharajapuram S. Srinivasan, Maharajapuram S. Ramachandran, and his primary disciple Dr. R. Ganesh are now carrying on his musical tradition. His other most popular songs are Purandaradasa kritis: "Narayana ninna" (Shuddha Dhanyasi) and "Govinda ninna".  His rendition of "Vilayada ithu nerama muruga" was without parallel.  His renditions were full of Bhakthi.

In Chennai, Griffith Road in T.Nagar was renamed as 'Maharajapuram Santhanam Salai' in honor of Maharajapuram Santhanam. The street has the famous Krishna Gana Sabha and Muppathamman Temple.

Awards and titles
 Padma Shri - 1990
 Sangeetha Kalanidhi from the Madras Music Academy - 1989
 Sangeet Natak Akademi award - 1984
 Kalaimamani award by Tamil Nadu Government
 "Sangeetha Sudhakara" by the Yoga vedanta University at Rishikesh
 "Gana Kalanidhi" by Sri Chandrasekhara Bharati of Sringeri Sharada Peetha
 "Sangitha Sagaramritha Varshi" by Jayendra Saraswathi of Kanchi Kamakoti Peetham.
 A former "Asthana Vidwan" of the Tirumala Tirupati Devasthanams, Kanchi Kamakoti Peetham, Pittsburgh Venkatachalapathi Temple and the Ganapathi Sachidananda Ashrama

References 

4.  ^ Maharajapuram Santhanam A Life of Music

External links
Maharajapuram musical family

1928 births
1992 deaths
Male Carnatic singers
Carnatic singers
Carnatic composers
Road incident deaths in India
20th-century Indian  male classical singers
20th-century Indian composers
Indian male composers
Musicians from Tamil Nadu
Recipients of the Padma Shri in arts
Recipients of the Sangeet Natak Akademi Award